Simprints is a nonprofit technology company originating at the University of Cambridge. The company builds biometric fingerprint technology for use by governments, NGOs, and nonprofits for people in the developing world who lack proof of legal identity. The company promotes a portable biometric system designed for front line workers. The technology uses Bluetooth to connect to an Android mobile device that is interoperable with existing mHealth systems such as CommCare, ODK, or DHIS2.

History 
Simprints emerged in May 2012 out of a hackathon organised by the Centre for Global Equality and sponsored by technology company Arm. The founders of Simprints include Gates-Cambridge scholars Alexandra Grigore, Toby Norman, and Daniel Storisteanu as well as Royal Holloway-University of London student Tristram Norman.

In 2014, the firm received a Round 4 Saving Lives at Birth Seed Grant, part of a Grand Challenges competition supported by the US Agency for International Development (USAID), the Government of Norway, the Bill & Melinda Gates Foundation, Grand Challenges Canada (funded by the Government of Canada), and the UK’s Department for International Development (DFID). This funding was partially matched by Arm ltd, a Cambridge based semiconductor and software company. This provided for a pilot study in partnership with BRAC and the Johns Hopkins Global mHealth Initiative to test the system with health workers in Gaibandha, Bangladesh.

In 2015, Simprints received another grant from Innovate UK (formerly the Technology Strategy Board) to move prototypes to the pre-production phase and develop and verify all software. This enabled the firm to launch a pilot project with BRAC which later manifested in a formal partnership.

In 2016, Simprints developed their first production-ready biometric scanner known as Vero. It is IP65 rated and CE/FCC certified. Simprints software architecture also conforms to EU Data regulation.

In 2017, the firm won a Round 7 Saving Lives at Birth Transition to Scale grant for $2 million to scale up Simprints partnership with BRAC’s maternal health program to reach 2 million expectant mothers and children in Bangladesh.

In 2019, Simprints announced that 3000 units of the Vero 2.0 would be shipped in early 2020.

Affiliations 
As of January 2023, Simprints' partners and financial supporters include:

Non-current partners and supporters include the Electric Power Research Institute, Grand Challenges Canada and Impact Network.

References

External links 
 Official website

Biometrics
Organisations based in Cambridge
Technology companies of the United Kingdom
Social enterprises